James John Atkinson (born August 1990) is an international cricketer who plays cricket for Hong Kong. He also captained the Hong Kong cricket team before stepping down in May 2015. A wicket-keeper, he has also represented Hong Kong at Under-19s level, and was selected as part of their squad for the 2010 U-19 Cricket World Cup. He was the first player (either male or female) born in the 1990s to play in ODI cricket as he made his debut at the age of 17 in 2008 against Pakistan during the 2008 Asia Cup. His father Steve played Minor Counties cricket.

In 2014, Atkinson captained the Hong Kong team in their first global tournament, the World T20 in Bangladesh, defeating the hosts in their final match after two losses. His highest score was 31 from 20 balls against Afghanistan in Chittagong before getting out LBW.

In May 2015, he stepped down as Hong Kong's captain citing lack of form as his main reason. The decision came after he led the side in a 59-run win over Namibia in which he made an unbeaten 37-ball 64 in a T20 match. In April 2019, he was named in Hong Kong's squad for the 2019 ICC World Cricket League Division Two tournament in Namibia. In May 2022, he was named in Hong Kong's side for the 2022 Uganda Cricket World Cup Challenge League B tournament.

References

External links 
 

1990 births
Living people
Hong Kong cricketers
Hong Kong cricket captains
Hong Kong One Day International cricketers
Hong Kong Twenty20 International cricketers
Durham MCCU cricketers
Warwickshire cricketers
Cricketers at the 2010 Asian Games
Cricketers at the 2014 Asian Games
Hong Kong people of English descent
Alumni of St Mary's College, Durham
Asian Games competitors for Hong Kong
Wicket-keepers